Fives  is a former commune in the Nord department in northern France, since 1858 part of Lille.

It gave its name to an engineering group founded in the nineteenth century, the Compagnie de Fives-Lille.

Heraldry

See also
 Communes of the Nord department
 SC Fives, a former French football club from Fives

Lille
Former communes of Nord (French department)